Hathor 7 - Coptic Calendar - Hathor 9

The eighth day of the Coptic month of Hathor, the third month of the Coptic year. On a common year, this day corresponds to November 4, of the Julian Calendar, and November 17, of the Gregorian Calendar. This day falls in the Coptic season of Peret, the season of emergence.

Commemorations

Saints 

 The martyrdom of Saint Nikandros, Priest of Myra 
 The departure of Saint Pierius, Dean of the Theological School of Alexandria

Other commemorations 

 The commemoration of the Four Incorporeal Creatures

References 

Days of the Coptic calendar